Neviusia alabamensis, the Alabama snow-wreath, is  a small shrub which is native to the Southeastern United States.

Neviusia alabamensis is considered rare throughout its range. It is found in widely scatted populations from northwestern Georgia to the Ozark Mountains, but the populations are thought to be mostly asexual clones, as no seed production has been observed. Because of its thinly scattered distribution and low genetic variability, it is of conservation concern. Its natural habitat is limestone woodlands with seasonal moisture.

There are two other members of the genus Neviusia, the California endemic species Neviusia cliftonii, and the extinct species Neviusia dunthornei.

References 
 

alabamensis
Flora of the United States
Plants described in 1858
Taxa named by John Edward Gray